Pasuk may refer to:
 Pasuk, Iran
 Passuk, a verse in the Hebrew Bible